Francesco Anile (born 12 February 1962 in Polistena) is an Italian tenor. He regularly sings in Italy and abroad, performing in theatres such as the Teatro Massimo in Palermo and San Carlo in Naples. Turandot, Norma and Otello are some of the works of his repertory which he plays with more strength and character. In March 2009, he was Manrico in Verdi's Il trovatore, and he has performed Canio in Pagliacci, directed by Franco Zeffirelli.

Biography
Graduated in clarinet and singing at the "F. Cilea" Conservatory of Reggio Calabria, Francesco Anile completed his studies with the baritone Aldo Protti in Cremona, and later as a tenor with Ottavio Taddei in Firenze. In 2001, he took a high-specialization course at Opera Verdi Festival in Parma, under the supervision of Renata Scotto.

Anile made his New York City Opera debut on the NYCO's Opening Night for the 2016-17 season, on September 8, 2016 in a new production double bill of two operas that both premiered in May 1892. He debuted as Canio in Pagliacci directed by Lev Pugliese with conductor James Meena leading the NYCO Orchestra at Rose Theater at Jazz at Lincoln Center's Rose Hall.  New York Classical Review wrote: "Anile ... has the voice: a clear, expressive instrument that pleasantly “pings” above the orchestra, and equally, what appears to be a fountain of acting chops. In the famous scene in which Canio realizes that Nedda has been unfaithful, the soft sobbing into his costume was undeniably affecting. And when he leaped onstage to open the traveling show, his drunkenness was believable, not overdone." The Huffington Post wrote: "Anile’s Canio was a virile, force of nature performance."

Awards
Finalist in several nationwide competitions, he won the first prize "E. Bastianini" at the Grandi Voci Toscane in Campi Bisensio and the third prize at the "M. Del Monaco" in Marsala.

Conductors and directors
Francesco Anile has worked with some of the more notable international conductors, such as Nello Santi, Maurizio Benini, Evelino Pidò, Maurizio Arena, Gianandrea Noseda, Massimo Pradella, Niksa Bareza, Loris Voltolini, Stefano Ranzani, Peter Mianiti, Antonio Pirolli, Giampaolo Bisanti, Patrick Fourniller, and Julian Kovatchev. He also worked with several internationally renowned directors, such as Eimuntas Nekrosius, Roberto De Simone, Gianfranco de Bosio, Federico Tiezzi, Plamen Kartalof, Henning Brockhaus, Pierfrancesco Maestrini, Aldo Tarabella, and J. Peter Messner.

Repertoire
Over a number of few years, Francesco Anile's repertory has gradually grown enriched by major roles, such as: Cavaradossi (Tosca), Pinkerton (Madama Butterfly), Luigi (Tabarro), Ishmael (Nabucco), Manrico (Il trovatore), Duke of Mantua (Rigoletto), and Radamès (Aida).

His vocal timbre has recently improved, changing him into a lyric and dramatic tenor. He has reached a heavier vocal weight, enabling his voice to be "pushed" to dramatic climaxes without strain. It is the reason why he now prefers roles such as Calaf (Turandot), Cavaliere Des Grieux (Manon Lescaut), Canio (Pagliacci), Pollione (Norma) and Otello.

He made his Metropolitan Opera debut on April 23, 2016 in the role of Otello, replacing Aleksandrs Antonenko, who lost his voice near the end of the opera.

He also interprets the Messa di Requiem by Verdi, the Messa di Gloria by Puccini and the Messe à S. Cecile by Bizet.

Performances

References

External links
 
 Francesco Anile Operabase
 Francesco Anile's pictures on Flickr

1962 births
Living people
Italian operatic tenors
People from the Province of Reggio Calabria
20th-century Italian  male  opera singers
21st-century Italian  male opera singers